A special election was held in  on March 8, 1808 to fill a vacancy left by the death of Ezra Darby (DR) on January 27, 1808

Election results

Boyd took office on April 1, 1808

See also
List of special elections to the United States House of Representatives

References

New Jersey 1808 at-large
New Jersey 1808 at-large
1808
New Jersey
United States House of Representatives

United States House of Representatives 1808 at-large